David Emanuel Daniel (Taneli) Europaeus (1820–1884) was a Finnish linguist and folklore collector.

During the period 1845–54, he made several trips to Finnish and Russian Karelia. Of his large and valuable collections, Elias Lönnrot received, among other things, the entire Kullervo section for the expanded second edition of the Kalevala in 1849. Europaeus also collected Sámi traditions. As a linguist, he was primarily interested in the early history of the Finnish language and the Finnish people. He is considered the founder of onomastics in Finland.

He published a Swedish-Finnish dictionary (1852-53) and Suomalaisten puustavein äännöskuvat (1857).

References

External links
 D.E.D. Europaeus in 375 Humanists 25.2.2015 - Faculty of Arts, University of Helsinki

Linguists from Finland
Finnish lexicographers
People from Savitaipale
Burials at Hietaniemi Cemetery
1820 births
1884 deaths